Yuri César Santos de Oliveira Silva (born 6 May 2000) is a Brazilian professional footballer who plays as a midfielder for Shabab Al Ahli.

Career

Flamengo
Yuri César made his professional debut with Flamengo in a 0-0 Campeonato Carioca tie with Macaé on 18 January 2020.

Fortaleza (loan)
On 8 March 2020 Yuri signed with Fortaleza on loan until the end of the 2020 Campeonato Brasileiro Série A.

Shabab Al-Ahli
On 28 January 2021 Yuri signed with Shabab Al Ahli.

Career statistics

References

External links
 
 

2000 births
Living people
People from Volta Redonda
Brazilian footballers
Brazilian expatriate footballers
Association football midfielders
Campeonato Brasileiro Série A players
UAE Pro League players
CR Flamengo footballers
Fortaleza Esporte Clube players
Shabab Al-Ahli Club players
Expatriate footballers in the United Arab Emirates
Brazilian expatriate sportspeople in the United Arab Emirates
Sportspeople from Rio de Janeiro (state)